The Henry M. Grant House is a house located in northwest Portland, Oregon, listed on the National Register of Historic Places.

See also
 National Register of Historic Places listings in Northwest Portland, Oregon

References

1892 establishments in Oregon
Houses completed in 1892
Houses on the National Register of Historic Places in Portland, Oregon
Northwest Portland, Oregon
Portland Historic Landmarks
Queen Anne architecture in Oregon